Njål Ølnes (born 24 September 1965 in Sogndal, Norway) is a Norwegian jazz musician (tenor saxophone), composer and jazz educator currently residing in Nesodden.

Career 
Ølnes is a graduate of the Jazz program at the Trondheim Musikkonsevatorium (1988–92), and was for many years music teacher at Sund Folkehøgskole, where he has been a major driving force behind the vital jazz studies. He was also a perennial leader of Inderøyningen Jazz Forum and organizer of the little connoisseur jazz festival "Soddjazz" at Inderøy. He also teaches jazz at Trondheim Musikkonsevatorium.

Ølnes' performances include the Woodwind trio Decoy with Trygve Seim and Håvard Lund, including one album release, within Dingobats together with Eirik Hegdal (saxophones), Thomas T. Dahl (guitar), Mats Eilertsen (bass) and Sverre Gjørvad (drums), including one album releases, within African Pepperbirds together with Bjørn Ole Solberg (alto saxophone), Vigleik Storaas/Erlend Slettevoll (piano), Mattis Kleppen (bass) and Tor Haugerud/Kenneth Kapstad (drums), including one album release, within Gibrish together with Michael Francis Duch (bass), Kjetil Møster (tenor saxophone) and Tor Haugerud (drums).

Ølnes is currently most active in the trio BMX, together with guitarist Thomas T. Dahl and drummer Øyvind Skarbø.

Discography 

Within Dingobats
1998: The New Dingobats Generation (Turn Left Prod)
2002: Pöck (Bergland Productions), which featured Live Maria Roggen (vocals)
2004: Follow (Jazzaway Records)

With Eirik Hegdal & Trondheim Jazz Orchestra
2005: We Are? (Jazzaway Records)
2008: Wood And Water (MNJ Records)

With Afric Pepperbirds
2006: Cape Point (Bergland Productions)

With BMX
2010: Bergen Open (NorCD), including with Øyvind Skarbø, Thomas T. Dahl & Per Jørgensen

References

External links 
Myspace BMX
Dingobats on Kunst.no

Avant-garde jazz musicians
Norwegian jazz saxophonists
Norwegian jazz composers
Berklee College of Music alumni
Spellemannprisen winners
Musicians from Sogndal
1965 births
Living people
21st-century saxophonists
Trondheim Jazz Orchestra members
Dingobats members
People from Nesodden